Dennis Johannes van Wijk (born 16 December 1962) is a Dutch football coach and former football player. He is currently unemployed after most recently managing Oostende in the Belgian First Division A.

Van Wijk was a left-back who began his career in the youth system of Ajax Amsterdam. He was unable to break into the first team and joined Norwich City F.C. in 1982. He spent four years at Carrow Road and was a member of the Norwich teams that won the English League Cup in 1985 and the Second Division Championship in 1986. In that 1985 final, Van Wijk conceded a penalty kick when he handled in the area. To the relief of Van Wijk and Norwich, Clive Walker of Sunderland missed the penalty and Norwich won 1–0.

After leaving Norwich, Van Wijk played for a series of teams until 1995. He won the Belgian League championship and Belgian Supercup with Club Brugge . After having managed several Belgium teams since 1995, he became manager of Willem II Tilburg in the Netherlands in 2006. On 4 November 2007, he left the club due to bad performances of the team. 
Van Wijk is the son of former professional footballer Hassie van Wijk.

Career

As a player
1968–1981 De Volewijckers (Netherlands)
1981–1982 Ajax (Netherlands)
1982–1986 Norwich City F.C. (England)
1986–1989 Club Brugge (Belgium)
1989–1990 Ajax (Netherlands)
1990–1991 PAS Giannina (Greece)
1991–1992 Club Brugge (Belgium)
1993–1994 Knokke (Belgium)

As manager
1994–1995 Knokke (player-manager) (Belgium)
1995–1996 Knokke (manager) (Belgium)
1996-10/1998 KV Oostende (Belgium)
10-11/1998 Daring Blankenberge (Belgium)
11/1998-2002 Cercle Brugge (Belgium)
2003–2006 Roeselare (Belgium)
2006–2007 Willem II Tilburg (Netherlands)
2007 KV Oostende (Belgium)
2007–2008 K. Sint-Truidense V.V. (Belgium)
2008–2010 Roeselare (Belgium)
2011–2012 R.A.E.C. Mons (Belgium) 
2012 R. Charleroi S.C. (Belgium)
2012–2013 Royal Antwerp F.C. (Belgium)
2013–2014 Westerlo (Belgium)
2015-2016 Cercle Brugge (Belgium)
2016 Beerschot Wilrijk (Belgium)
2017 OH Leuven (Belgium)
2017–2018 Roeselare (Belgium)
2018– Mechelen (Belgium)

Honours

As manager
 Belgian Second Division Championship winner 2007–08, 2009–10, 2010–11, 2011–12

As a player
 English League Cup winner 1984–85
 Second Division Championship winner 1985–86
 Belgian League Championship winner 1987–88
 Belgian Supercup winner 1988

Sources

Career information at ex-canaries.co.uk
Canary Citizens by Mark Davage, John Eastwood, Kevin Platt, published by Jarrold Publishing, (2001),

External links
Career information at ex-canaries.co.uk

1962 births
Living people
People from Oostzaan
Dutch footballers
Dutch expatriate footballers
AFC Ajax players
Van Wijk
Van Wijk
PAS Giannina F.C. players
Eredivisie players
Van Wijk
Van Wijk
Expatriate footballers in Greece
Dutch football managers
Dutch expatriate football managers
Van Wijk
Eredivisie managers
Willem II (football club) managers
Van Wijk
Van Wijk
Van Wijk
Van Wijk
Van Wijk
Van Wijk
Van Wijk
Van Wijk
AVV De Volewijckers players
Association football defenders
R.A.E.C. Mons managers
Footballers from North Holland